Julia Burnham was an American screenwriter and novelist active during Hollywood's silent era. Burnham joined the scenario staff at Metro in 1920 after spending time at Fox.

Selected filmography 

 The Fatal Hour (1920)
 Lure of Ambition (1919)
 Love, Honor and -- ? (1919)
 The Love Auction (1919)
 The Call of the Soul (1919)
 A Soul Without Windows (1918)
 Wanted: A Mother (1918)
 The Volunteer (1917)
 Adventures of Carol (1917)
 The Little Duchess (1917)

References 

American women screenwriters
American screenwriters
20th-century American novelists
20th-century American women writers
American women novelists
Year of birth missing
Year of death missing